ÖDP  may refer to:

 Özgürlük ve Dayanışma Partisi, Turkey
 Ökologisch-Demokratische Partei, Germany